The 6.5×47mm Lapua (designated as the 6,5 × 47 Lapua by the C.I.P.) is a smokeless powder rimless bottlenecked rifle cartridge that was developed specifically for  competition shooting by ammunition maker Nammo Lapua and the Swiss rifle manufacturer Grünig & Elmiger AG in 2005. Other common names for this cartridge include 6.5×47mm.

Features

The cartridge has many special features, including:
 The cartridge chamber dimensions are optimized for target bullets.
 High pressure level ( Pmax piezo pressure) and cartridge case capacity enables relative high velocity and flat trajectory.
 Reduced barrel wear compared to 6mm Norma BR
 The 6.5×47mm Lapua has a base diameter and overall length similar to the 7.62×51mm NATO/.308 Winchester, allowing it to accept the same bolt heads and fit into similar short actions and magazines.
 A small rifle primer that is easier to seat and allows for higher case pressure than a large rifle primer.

History
The 6.5×47mm Lapua has no direct parent case. It was designed by Lapua with a great deal of help from Swiss rifle manufacturer, Grünig & Elmiger. The case also borrows many characteristics from the 6mm PPC and has proven itself to be inherently accurate.

Cartridge dimensions
The 6.5×47mm Lapua has 3.11 ml (48.0 grains H2O) cartridge case capacity.

6.5×47mm Lapua maximum C.I.P. cartridge dimensions. All sizes in millimeters (mm).

Americans would define the shoulder angle at alpha/2 = 30 degrees. The common rifling twist rate for this cartridge is 200 mm (1 in 7.87 in), 6 grooves, Ø lands = , Ø grooves = , land width = , and the primer type is small rifle.

According to the official C.I.P. (Commission Internationale Permanente pour l'Epreuve des Armes à Feu Portatives) rulings the 6.5×47mm Lapua  can handle up to  Pmax piezo pressure. In C.I.P. regulated countries every rifle cartridge combo has to be proofed at 125% of this maximum C.I.P. pressure to certify for sale to consumers.
This means that 6.5×47mm Lapua chambered arms in C.I.P. regulated countries are currently (2018) proof tested at  PE piezo pressure.

Performance
The 6.5×47mm Lapua is a medium power cartridge often compared to the .260 Remington and 6.5 Creedmoor.
It was designed from the beginning by Lapua to optimize accuracy, barrel life, and case capacity in a 6.5 mm cartridge for target and tactical shooting. As such it couples a sensible case volume (3.11 ml) to bore area (34.59 mm2/0.3459 cm2) ratio with ample space for loading relatively long slender projectiles that can provide good aerodynamic efficiency and external ballistic performance for the projectile diameter. The 6.5×47mm Lapua offers slightly lower muzzle velocities than 6.5 mm/.260 cartridges such as the 6.5 Creedmoor and .260 Remington due to its smaller case volume. In an article by the Precision Rifle Blog a survey of the top 100 shooters in the precision rifle series (PRS) showed that the 6.5 Creedmoor was on average  faster than the 6.5×47mm Lapua. Although the 6.5×47mm Lapua is said to have superior brass quality compared to the 6.5 Creedmoor. The 6.5×47mm Lapua was the most popular cartridge during the PRS competition in 2015 beating out competing cartridges by more than two thirds.

C.I.P. rules the 6.5×47mm Lapua and 6.5mm Creedmoor both at up to  Pmax piezo pressure and the .260 Remington lower at up to  Pmax piezo pressure.

Competitions
Erik Cortina broke a  club record with 6.5×47 Lapua (RL17). Cortina shot a 600-49X; the previous record was 599-32X. In the summer of 2016 Mike Gaizauskas shot a ten shot group measuring just 2.856 inches at  beating out the record previously held by the 6mm Dasher. 
American Kevin Nevius set a new NRA national record for high power rifle with a perfect score of 200-20X at  – 20 shots (Prone-Any Sight). Nevius was using 6.5×47mm Lapua, 136 gr. Scenar-L OTM bullets, and VV N150 powder. The 6.5×47mm Lapua was also the dominant caliber in PRS in 2016, beating out all competing cartridges in the top ten tier, and dominated the other categories by more than two thirds.

The 6.5×47mm Lapua has become very popular with metallic silhouette shooters. The 2014 high NRA Nation Championship equipment survey lists the 6.5×47mm Lapua as second most popular caliber for both the high power rifle and high power hunter rifle competition.

The old record was 1.437".

Variants
Soon after the introduction of the 6.5×47mm Lapua, shooters were using the case as the basis for a new wildcat, by necking it down to 6 mm. This wildcat cartridge is often called a 6-6.5×47 to avoid confusing it with the 6×47 Swiss Match, a similar case but with a large rifle primer. Another version that has been popular is a necked-down version with a 40-degree shoulder. PTG sells reamers for this and it has demonstrated a gain of about 100 fps over the standard 6-6.5×47.

See also
 List of firearms
 List of rifle cartridges
 6 mm caliber
 .243 Winchester
 6.5×54mm Mannlicher–Schönauer - a cartridge that saw military service with the Greek Army from 1903-1949, which fires the same diameter and weight 9.0g bullet as the 6.5×47mm Lapua but achieves a lower muzzle velocity
 6.5×52mm Carcano

Notes

External links 

 6.5x47 Cartridge Guide, cartridge specs, load data, reloading tips, and more
 Zak Smith, 6.5mm Shootout: .260 Remington vs. 6.5x47 Lapua vs. 6.5 Creedmoor
 First Born: Darrell's 6.5x47mm Lapua
 Zak Smith, 6.5x47 Lapua Tactical TackDriver (6mmBR.com Gun Of The Week)
 Nielson's 6.5×47 Nationals Winner, 6.5x47 Lapua Competition winner (Accurateshooter.com Gun of the Week)
 Beginski's new 6mm-6.5×47 Lapua, 6-6.5x47mm Lapua 3-Way Velocity Challenge: 6BR vs. 6BRX vs. 6-6.5x47 Lapua
 7mm Wildcat based on 6.5×47 Lapua Case, 7mm version of the 6.5x47 Lapua (Accurateshooter.com Bulletin)

Pistol and rifle cartridges
Nammo Lapua cartridges